Stefano Bonaccini (born 1 January 1967) is an Italian politician and member of the Democratic Party (PD), of which he is serving as president since 12 March 2023. Moreover, Bonaccini has been serving as the president of Emilia-Romagna since 24 November 2014. Bonaccini started his political career in the Italian Communist Party (PCI) and followed that party's transition toward social democracy, becoming one of the main representatives of the PD's reformist or moderate wing.

Early political career
Stefano Bonaccini was born in Campogalliano, near Modena, on 1 January 1967, in a lower middle-class family. His father was a truck driver, while his mother worked in a factory.

After attending the scientific lyceum, he started his political career during the 1980s, as a member of the peace movements. Contextually, he joined the Italian Communist Party (PCI), for which he became municipal assessor in the town of Campogaliano, where he lived. The PCI was transformed into the Democratic Party of the Left (PDS) and, in 1993, Bonaccini became provincial secretary of the Left Youth (SG), the PDS youth-wing. Two years later, in 1995, he was elected provincial secretary of the PDS of Modena. In 1998, he joined the newly formed  Democrats of the Left (DS). From 1999 to 2006, he served as Modena's municipal assessor for public works, cultural heritage and historical city center.

In 2007, he was appointed the provincial secretary of the Democratic Party (PD), the new centre-left party formed by the union between DS and the Christian centrist party, The Daisy (DL). Two years later he was elected regional secretary of the PD for Emilia-Romagna.

After the 2010 regional election, Bonaccini was elected regional councilor for the Democratic Party. During the legislature he became one of the closer advisors of incumbent governor Vasco Errani, who was ruling the region since 1999. During these years, Bonaccini was widely considered as one of Errani's most probable successors. On 13 December 2013, he was appointed national coordinator for "Local Authorities" in the national secretariat of the PD, under the leadership of Matteo Renzi, who Bonaccini supported in the 2013 primary election.

President of Emilia-Romagna (2014–present)
After the resignation of Emilia-Romagna's long-time President Errani, Bonaccini emerged as the most probable candidate for the presidency. However, he was initially challenged by the President of the Regional Council, Matteo Richetti. In September 2014, they were both under investigation for embezzlement. Richetti withdrew his candidacy, while Bonaccini decided to continue his campaign. The two politicians would be later acquitted from all charges.

On 28 September, Bonaccini won the centre-left primary election to become the presidential candidate for the Democratic Party, with 60.9% of the votes against the former mayor of Forlì, Roberto Balzani.

First term
On 23 November 2014, he won the regional election in Emilia-Romagna with 49.1% of the votes, defeating the centre-right candidate Alan Fabbri and becoming the 9th President of the region.

On 20 July 2015, Bonaccini signed so-called the "Pact for Labour", a deal between regional government, trade unions and entrepreneurs, to relaunch employment in the region. The Pact allocated, in almost five years, more than 22 billion euros.

On 17 December 2015, Bonaccini was elected President of the Conference of the Regions and Autonomous Provinces, replacing Piedmontese President Sergio Chiamparino, who resigned a few weeks before. While on 12 December 2016, he was elected president of the Council of European Municipalities and Regions (CEMR), the largest organisation of local and regional governments in Europe.

Since 2014, the regional government cut the waiting lists for patients and exams in health and opened many "health houses" for proximity medicine. Moreover Emilia-Romagna was the first region in Italy to abolish the so-called superticket and started a drastic reduction of the fees for the nests.

In 2017 and 2018, Bonaccini's government implemented a policy aimed to increase the political and fiscal autonomy of Emilia-Romagna. Bonaccini stated: "We have activated the path towards a greater regional autonomy to better face the challenges of change. We want an autonomy that respects the Constitution, national unity and solidarity between territories, which are principles that are absolutely inviolable for us, but capable of improving relations between central administration and local autonomies. Above all, we need an autonomy to strengthen investment planning, to streamline and simplify procedures, to make our services for citizens and businesses even more efficient and effective."

During his first term, Emilia-Romagna lived a period of economic prosperity. Unemployment went down from 9% in 2014, to 4.8% in 2019, while the employment rate rose to 71%, the highest in the country. The region was also the first one in Italy for GDP growth from 2014 to 2019 and the first region for export "per capita".

2020 regional election

Despite Emilia-Romagna having always been considered one of the "red regions" – a stronghold of left-wing parties since the end of the World War II – due to the right-wing surge in the country, the 2020 regional election was considered as the first competitive one in the history of the region. Bonaccini was confirmed the centre-left candidate at the head of a coalition including the PD and its left-wing allies of Free and Equal (LeU) and Green Europe (EV), as well as More Europe (+Eu). Bonaccini also launched a personal civic list, named "Bonaccini for President", which included, among others, members from Matteo Renzi's Italia Viva (IV), Carlo Calenda's Action and Federico Pizzarotti's Italia in Comune (IiC).

The centre-right proposed Senator Lucia Borgonzoni, member of the League (Lega) and former undersecretary to cultural activities in Giuseppe Conte's first government. The centre-right coalition included also Brothers of Italy (FdI), Forza Italia (FI) and Cambiamo! (C!).

During the campaign, Bonaccini claimed the results achieved by his administration (including the "Pact for Labour" of 2015), and proposed four priority points summed up into the slogan "A step forward": to create free kindergartens for all children in the region, to break down the waiting lists for health interventions and access times to first aid, to carry out preventive maintenance and safety of the regional territory, and to reduce the phenomenon of NEET.

The electoral campaign was characterized by a massive presence of League's leader, Matteo Salvini, who aimed to win in Emilia-Romagna to tear down the government. However, his campaign led to the birth of the Sardines movement, a grassroots political movement, which organized a series of peaceful demonstrations to protest against the right-wing surge in the country and, more specifically, against the political rhetoric of Salvini.

On 26 January, Bonaccini was re-elected to a second term, with more than 51% of votes, against 43% of Borgonzoni. The centre-left alliance scored particularly well in Bologna, Modena, Reggio Emilia and Ravenna, where Bonaccini approached or even overcame the 60% of votes.

COVID-19 pandemic
In March 2020, Italy was severely hit by the coronavirus pandemic and Emilia-Romagna became one of the most affected regions. As of March 2021, Emilia-Romagna more than 276,000 cases and 10,000 deaths were confirmed.

On 4 March, when Emilia-Romagna's regional minister of health, Raffaele Donini, was declared positive for COVID-19, Governor Bonaccini appointed Sergio Venturi as Extraordinary Commissioner for the emergency. Venturi served as regional minister oh health from 2014 to 2020.

On 9 March 2020, the government of Italy under Prime Minister Giuseppe Conte imposed a national quarantine, restricting the movement of the population except for necessity, work, and health circumstances in the whole country. On 16 March, Bonaccini imposed a strengthened quarantine on the municipality of Medicina, near Bologna, since it had developed an intense outbreak. People were not allowed to enter or exit the town for any reason. While on 21 March, he closed supermarkets during the weekends. On 18 May, the lockdown officially ended.

On 1 November 2020, Bonaccini was tested positive to COVID-19, amid a pandemic resurgence in the country. On 13 November, he was hospitalized with a bilateral pneumonia and discharged after a few days.

In March 2021, when his region was heavily hit by a third wave of the pandemic, Bonaccini imposed red zones in the provinces of Bologna, Modena and in many municipalities through Romagna.

2023 Democratic Party leadership run and party presidency
Following the resignations of Enrico Letta as secretary of the Democratic Party after the 2022 Italian general election, Bonaccini was immediately touted as a potential candidate for the party leadership. On 20 November 2022, Bonaccini formally announced his candidacy as leader of the Democratic Party.

In the 2023 leadership election, Bonaccini won the first round, achieving 52.87% among party members, but eventually lost to his former deputy Elly Schlein in the open primary election on 26 February 2023. He was successively named as the new party president on 12 March 2023, following an agreement between him and Schlein.

Personal life
Bonaccini is married to Sandra Notari, a small business owner from Modena. They met the first time during a meeting between Modena's city council, of which Bonaccini served as assessor, and local business owners. The couple has two daughters, Maria Vittoria and Virginia.

Until 39 years old, Bonaccini played as a forward in many local football teams. He is an avid supporter of Juventus FC and Modena Volley.

Electoral history

References

1967 births
Living people
Presidents of Emilia-Romagna
Politicians from Modena
Democratic Party of the Left politicians
20th-century Italian politicians
Democrats of the Left politicians
Democratic Party (Italy) politicians
21st-century Italian politicians
Members of the Legislative Assembly of Emilia-Romagna